Anne Elliott Hodges-Copple is sixth and current Suffragan Bishop of North Carolina.

Biography 
Anne graduated with a Bachelor of Arts from Duke University in 1979. After working as a community organizer for several years following graduation, she earned a Master of Divinity from Pacific School of Religion in 1984. She was ordained deacon in 1987 and priest in 1988, and served as assistant of St Luke's Church in Durham, North Carolina until 1992. She then became the Episcopal chaplain to Duke University until 2005, when she returned to St Luke's Church as rector.

Anne was elected on January 25, 2013, as Suffragan Bishop of North Carolina. She was consecrated as a bishop on June 15, 2013. From November 1, 2015, until July 15, 2017, she served as Bishop Pro Tempore of the Diocese of North Carolina, due to the resignation of Michael Bruce Curry to become the Presiding Bishop of the Episcopal Church. She returned to bishop suffragan upon the consecration of Samuel Sewall Rodman III as 12th Bishop Diocesan of North Carolina. Hodges-Copple is the first female bishop in the Diocese of North Carolina. On February 22, 2022 she announced her retirement as of December 2022.

See also
 List of Episcopal bishops of the United States
 Historical list of the Episcopal bishops of the United States

References 

Living people
Women Anglican bishops
Episcopal Church in North Carolina
Duke University alumni
Pacific School of Religion alumni
Year of birth missing (living people)
Episcopal bishops of North Carolina